Muggiaea is a genus of siphonophores in the family Diphyidae. Members of this family are colonial siphonophores with two nectophores (swimming bells) arranged one behind the other, but in the genus Muggiaea, the posterior nectophore is absent. The anterior one has a complete dorsal ridge. The somatocyst (extension of the gastrovascular system) is very close to the nectosac (central cavity with muscular walls) wall.

Species
The World Register of Marine Species includes the following species in the genus:

 Muggiaea atlantica Cunningham, 1892
 Muggiaea bargmannae Totton, 1954
 Muggiaea delsmani Totton, 1954
 Muggiaea kochii (Will, 1844)

References

Diphyidae
Hydrozoan genera